Adonara is a Central Malayo-Polynesian language of the islands of Adonara and Solor, east of Flores in Indonesia.

References

Flores-Lembata languages
Languages of Indonesia